Stromboscerus is a genus of the weevil subfamily Dryophthorinae. Two species of this genus are distributed in Madagascar.

References 

Dryophthorinae
Insects of Madagascar